Paracestracion is an extinct genus of heterodontid sharks from Early Jurassic to Early Cretaceous-aged rocks of England, France, Germany and Luxembourg. The genus, first described in 1911 by Ernst Hermann Friedrich von Koken in Karl Alfred von Zittel, contains five species: P. bellis from the Bathonian of England, the type species P. falcifer from the Tithonian and Kimmeridgian of Weymouth, England and Solnhofen, Germany, which was originally named as a species of Cestracion (now seen as a synonym of Heterodontus) in 1857 by Johann Andreas Wagner, P. pectinatus from the Valanginian of France, P. sarstedtensis, originally classified as a species of Heterodontus, from the Toarcian and Aalenian of Germany, and P. viohli from the Tithonian-aged Painten Formation of Germany, with a sixth indeterminate species known from the Toarcian-aged Variabilis layer of the La Couche à Crassum (part of the larger Posidonia Shale) of Luxembourg.

References

Taxa named by Johann Andreas Wagner

Heterodontiformes
Fossil taxa described in 1911
Jurassic sharks
Cretaceous sharks
Toarcian first appearances